Spring Session M is the debut studio album by American new wave band Missing Persons. It was released on October 8, 1982 by Capitol Records. The title of the album is an anagram of the band's name. Produced by Ken Scott with the songs written by Terry Bozzio, Dale Bozzio and Warren Cuccurullo, Spring Session M is a new wave rock album with elements of synthpop.

Upon its release, the album received generally positive reviews from music critics and also noted commercial success, peaking at number 17 on the Billboard 200. Spring Session M was certified gold by the Recording Industry Association of America (RIAA).

Four singles were released from the album: "Words", "Windows", "Destination Unknown", and "Walking in L.A." All singles charted on the Billboard Hot 100, with "Words" and "Destination Unknown" both reaching #42, and the music videos also received regular airplay on MTV.

Track listings

CD Bonus Tracks (2021 Rubellan Remasters edition)

Personnel

Missing Persons
 Dale Bozzio – vocals
 Terry Bozzio – vocals, keyboards, synthesizers, drums, percussion
 Warren Cuccurullo – guitar, vocals
 Patrick O'Hearn – electric & synthesized bass, keyboards, synthesizers
 Chuck Wild – synthesizer, keyboard

Production
 Ken Scott – producer, engineer
 Brian Leshon, Phil Jost, Ralph Sutton – assistant engineers
 Bernie Grundman - mastering
 Glen Wexler – photography, art direction, design
 Kurt Triffet – artwork and design

Charts

Weekly charts

Year-end charts

Certifications and sales

References

External links

Missing Persons (band) albums
1982 debut albums
Albums produced by Ken Scott
Capitol Records albums